There are two national parks in Curacao. The oldest one was established in 1978. CARAMBI is responsible for the management of Christhoffel park and Shete Boka park.

References

 List
Curaçao
National parks